Plocama pendula is a species of flowering plant in the coffee family Rubiaceae, endemic to the Canary islands. The fruit is a black berry.

References

pendula
Flora of the Canary Islands
Plants described in 1789